Vortex is a 2021 independent psychological drama film written and directed by Gaspar Noé. The film premiered in the Cannes Premiere section at the 2021 Cannes Film Festival. It stars Dario Argento as a father and author, Lui, his first leading role, alongside Françoise Lebrun as his wife, Elle, and Alex Lutz as his son, Stéphane.

The film received acclaim from critics and audiences, with particular praise for Noe's direction and writing, performances, emotional power, scope, ambition and execution.

Premise
Told entirely through split-screen, the story is set in northeast Paris, near the Stalingrad Station, and revolves around an elderly couple as they struggle with declining mental and physical health with the help of their adult son, who is also dealing with significant personal problems.

Cast
 Dario Argento as Lui
 Françoise Lebrun as Elle
 Alex Lutz as Stéphane
 Kylian Dheret as Kiki
 Kamel Benchemekh as L'épicier
 Corinne Bruand as Claire

Production 

Vortex was conceived after some of the inspiration for the film came from his experiences dealing with his mother’s dementia, as well as Noe being diagnosed with a brain hemorrhage that almost killed him in early 2020. In his first leading role, Argento, who lives in Italy, learned to speak in fluent but heavily accented French, sometimes pausing and fumbling to find the right word.

The film uses both split-screen and medium format, much like his previous film Lux Æterna (2019)

Release 

In August 2021, the film sold to Utopia for US distribution. It was released at the IFC Center on 29 April 2022, followed by an expansion to the rest of the US on 6 May 2022.

Reception 
The review aggregator website Rotten Tomatoes calculated a 93% approval rating from 88 reviews, with an average rating of 8.1/10, making it Noé's first film to earn a "Certified Fresh" rating for Rotten Tomatoes. The website's consensus reads, "Vortex is Gaspar Noé at his most unflinchingly pitiless -- but viewers who can make it through will be rewarded with a haunting contemplation of death." On Metacritic, the film has a weighted average score of 82 out of 100 from 29 reviews, indicating "universal acclaim". It holds the highest-rated critic scores for Gaspar Noé's films on both Rotten Tomatoes and Metacritic.

Justin Chang, a top critic of the Los Angeles Times, praised the film and noted: "It’s a bone-deep sensory immersion that never feels merely sensationalist, anchored by two performances of astonishing commitment and emotional power." Glenn Kenny of RogerEbert.com gave a perfect four out of four stars and noted: "One leaves Vortex feeling cleansed by fire."

Awards

References

External links
 

2021 films
2020s psychological drama films
2020s French-language films
2021 drama films
Films directed by Gaspar Noé
French drama films
French psychological drama films
Films about addiction
Films about dementia
Films about suicide
Wild Bunch (company) films
2020s French films
Films set in Paris